Merlock can refer to:

 The Merlock Mountains in J.R.R. Tolkien's poem The Mewlips (published 1962).
 Merlock the Magician from Disney's Scrooge McDuck Universe (1990).
 One of the wizards faced by contestants at the end of Nick Arcade's bonus round (1992).
 Merlock Holmes, a character in Flint the Time Detective (1998).
 A Sri Lankan heavy metal band documented in Arise (film) (2010).

See also
 Morlock (disambiguation)